Jeep — with a capital J — is a trademarked automotive brand, currently owned by Chrysler (officially FCA US LLC), part of Stellantis.

Jeep or jeep may also refer to:

Jeep-like vehicles
Vehicle concepts
 Four-wheel drive vehicles in general
 Off-road vehicles in general
 Military light utility vehicles in general, or of the -ton variety more specifically
 In the Philippines, Jeepneys are colloquially referred to as "jeeps."

Specific jeep-type vehicles
 List of U.S. military jeeps
 Willys MB / Ford GPW jeep and pre-production equivalents – the World War II U.S. four-wheel drive military utility vehicle, manufactured from 1941 to 1945
 Willys M38, the U.S. military jeep produced from 1949 to 1952
 Willys M38A1, the U.S. military jeep produced from 1953 to 1971
 Willys M606, M606A2 and -A3 — military Jeep versions for U.S. allied nations, from 1953 onwards
 Ford GTB 'Burma jeep' / G-622 – a compact, 1-ton, 4x4, U.S. military truck, from WW II
 Ford Pygmy, Ford's first prototype for the U.S. Army's requirement for the World War II light reconnaissance vehicle
 Ford M151, the replacement for the U.S. military Willys jeeps, produced from 1959 to 1988, and used through the 1990s
 M422 Mighty Mite, a U.S. military jeep small enough to be lifted by men or helicopters, produced from 1959 to 1962
 Dodge ½-ton VC and WC series – at least in some U.S. military branches, these were initially called "jeeps", before the quarter-ton Willys MB and Ford GPW
 Jeep CJ (originally Willys CJ, or Civilian Jeep), civilian version of the U.S. military Jeep
 Jeep Wrangler, a successor to the Jeep CJ
 Jeeps built by other companies, either by joint-venture, or with or without a license from Jeep

Other vehicles and craft
 Curtiss-Wright AT-9 Jeep, a WW II American military aircraft
 Escort carrier – a small, anti-submarine, escort aircraft carrier was called a "jeep carrier" in the U.S. Navy in WW II
 Minneapolis-Moline UTX and NTX 4x4 tractors (1940–1944) were called 'jeeps'

People
 Glenn Davis (athlete) (1934–2009), American Olympic athlete and NFL wide receiver nicknamed "Jeep"
 Jeep Swenson (1957–1997), an American wrestler and actor
 Johnny Hodges (1906–1970), an American jazz saxophonist nicknamed "Jeep"

Other uses
 Just Enough Education to Perform, an album by Stereophonics
 Jeep cap, a US Army issued wool knit cap generally like a toboggan cap
 Eugene the Jeep, a fictional character in the Thimble Theatre and Popeye comic strips

See also

Geep (disambiguation)
General purpose (disambiguation)
GP (disambiguation)